Jacob M. Hooker, Ph.D. is an American chemist and expert in molecular imaging, particularly in the development and application of simultaneous MRI and PET. He has contributed major advances on the entire spectrum of research from fundamental chemistry methodology with radioisotopes to human neuroimaging.

Life and education 
Hooker grew up just outside of Asheville, North Carolina and attended Enka High School. He graduated from North Carolina State University in 2002 as class Valedictorian and summa cum laude with bachelor of science degrees in Textile Chemistry and Chemistry. He then earned his doctorate of philosophy in Chemistry at the University of California, Berkeley, mentored by Professor Matt Francis. After hearing a neuroimaging presentation in 2006 by National Medal of Science recipient Joanna Fowler, Hooker immersed himself in postdoctoral training under her mentorship at the Brookhaven National Laboratory. Fowler recalls having Jacob as a postdoc "getting him was like winning the lottery" "He's going to ask questions we haven't thought of before." Hooker conducted his postdoctoral training with Fowler as a Goldhaber Distinguished Fellow, developing new neuroscience-oriented imaging methods and protocols.

Research and achievements 
Hooker relocated to Charlestown, MA in 2009 at the initiation of his independent research career at the Martinos Center. He co-designed and scratch-built a cyclotron and radiopharmacy facility housing a Siemens Eclipse HP Cyclotron, completed early 2011. The production and imaging facility – part of the Martinos Center Research Core – provides imaging tools for all stages of translational research.

The mission of his academic research lab is "to accelerate the study of the living, human brain and nervous system through development and application of molecular imaging agents." An organic chemist by training, Hooker and his research group are devoted to enhance understanding of the healthy brain and dysfunction in diseases including Alzheimer's, Autism and Schizophrenia.

His research focus centers on the themes of i) neuroepigenetics, ii) radiochemistry methods development and iii) neuroimaging methods development; highlights are provided in the following section.

Major publication themes 
Hooker has published over 100 papers Hooker JM bibliography, PubMed.gov ] most notably in the domains of:

Neuroepigenetics: visualizing histone deacetylase enzymes with PET 
Work from Hooker's group published in August 2016 – Wey & Gilbert et al 2016 Science Translational Medicine revealed the first visual maps of neuroepigenetic function in the living human brain using the Class-I histone deacetylase (HDAC) PET imaging probe [11C]Martinostat. This work demonstrated a link between quantitative HDAC maps of the brain and the expression of plasticity and disease-related genes under HDAC control. The human imaging report was built on a background of tool development in the Hooker lab spanning seven years, wherein small molecule histone deacetylase (HDAC) inhibitors were systematically screened and refined to resolve chemical leads with Class-I HDAC isoform selectivity, outstanding brain penetrance and appropriate binding kinetics. The first-in-human imaging paper set the stage for Hooker's ongoing work to measure and map HDAC density, distribution and connectivity in diverse diseases, in vivo.

Radiochemistry methods development: changing the chemical landscape for PET tracer production 
Hooker and his colleagues have made remarkable advances innovating in chemical and radiochemical synthetic methods to increase efficiency and expand capabilities of PET imaging. The most common radioisotopes for medical imaging agents, carbon-11 and fluorine-18, have a half-lives of 20.4 and 109.8 minutes, respectively. This presents significant demands in streamlining chemical synthesis steps and maximizing reaction yields in order to resolve sufficient quantities of radiotracer to complete required quality control steps before a dose can be 'released' for injection into a human subject. A critical element to this innovation has been the collaborative research environment cultivated within Hooker's lab to rethink dogmatic approaches to chemical endpoints or adapt cutting-edge organometallic chemistry to meet the needs of radiotracer synthesis.

Research Highlights in Radiochemistry
 In a 2011 Science paper, in collaboration with Tobias Ritter's lab at Harvard, Hooker demonstrated for the first time that a palladium-IV complex could fundamentally 'switch' the way fluoride behaves in chemical reactions, most aptly described as a switch from a nucleophile to an electrophile. In a separate and subsequent advance, this unconventional mindset led to the first demonstration of a concerted nucleophilic aromatic substitution reaction, published in Nature in 2016.
 Hooker and Stephen Buchwald (MIT) developed a strategy for labeling molecules with carbon-11 using cyanide nearly instantaneously using a biaryl phosphine Pd(0) complexes.
 Hooker and John T. Groves (Princeton) demonstrated the first example of radiofluorination with fluoride-18 using C-H  and decarboxylation with manganese catalysts.

Neuroimaging methods development: functional MR and PET brain imaging 
A new application for radiolabeled glucose: The main energy source of the brain, glucose, provides a significant biological foothold to image brain activity via energy use through cellular uptake and trapping of the glucose analog, [18F]fludexyglucose (FDG). Since the mid-1970s, FDG has been applied as a 'bolus' at the beginning of an imaging experiment with regional uptake measured and mapped after a waiting period during which brain cells unknowingly substitute radiolabeled FDG for normal glucose. Like long-exposure photographs, bolus FDG PET imaging paradigms are robust and valuable in identifying otherwise-inaccessible tissue types with differential metabolism (e.g. cancerous tumors, post-ischemic myocardial lesions, hypometabolic brain regions following aneurysm), but lack kinetic detail.

Despite some 40 years of [18F]FDG access and research, the dynamics of glucose utilization in response to brain activation remain poorly understood. Through innovations in radiotracer delivery and PET image processing, Prof. Hooker and his team were able to develop a method for brain glucose monitoring that produced something more like a movie, reporting changes in glucose use in response to multiple stimuli during a single PET scan. The lab is now expanding the concept of dynamic, functional PET imaging to measure real-time neurotransmitter release in the living human brain.

Evidence of glial activation in the brain with chronic low back pain: In a similar reconfiguration of existing tools, Hooker and his faculty colleague and fMRI expert, Marco Loggia were the first to use the novel technology of integrated positron emission tomography-magnetic resonance imaging with the radioligand [11C]-PBR28 to demonstrate increased brain levels of the translocator protein (TSPO), a marker of glial activation, in patients with chronic low back pain. The work not only provided a new biological mechanism to explore in chronic pain treatment, it also helped to spark a major programmatic theme at MGH in neuroinflammation; borne from this was the Boston-wide Neuroinflammation Think Tank which bridges together major stakeholders from academia, medicine, and the pharmaceutical industry.

Awards and honors 
In 2016, Hooker was named as a Phyllis and Jerome Lyle Rappaport MGH Research Scholar which acknowledges 'forward thinking researchers with the funding they need to take their work into uncharted territories'. His research proposal, entitled Visualizing Chemical Dysfunction in the Human Brain was awarded $500,000 over five years for its tangible vision to develop novel imaging tools and accelerate their application in in vivo imaging to understand normal brain growth, aging and function and draw comparisons to brain diseases such as schizophrenia, Alzheimer's disease, dementia and Autism.

In 2015, the Brain & Behavior Research Foundation acknowledged Jacob with an Independent Investigator Award for research piloting neuroimaging in patients with Schizophrenia. He was named by The Scientist magazine as a Scientist to Watch, and in an article dubbing him 'The Mind Mapper' was among inaugural winners of the Talented 12 Award from the American Chemical Society's C & E News.

Hooker was named by the National Academy of Sciences as a prestigious Kavli Fellow for a five-year tenure (2012-2017) and as a Keck Futures Initiative Fellow (2013-2015).

President Barack Obama endorsed Hooker on the basis of his scientific record and commitment to mentorship with a Presidential Early Career Award for Scientists and Engineers (PECASE) in 2010, closely following a 2009 Outstanding Mentor Award by the U.S. Department of Energy.

References 

Living people
21st-century American chemists
North Carolina State University alumni
University of California, Berkeley alumni
Neuroimaging researchers
Year of birth missing (living people)